213 (two hundred [and] thirteen) is the number following 212 and preceding 214.

In mathematics
213 and the other permutations of its digits are the only three-digit number whose digit sums and digit products are equal. It is a member of the quickly-growing Levine sequence, constructed from a triangle of numbers in which each row counts the copies of each value in the row below it.

As the product of the two distinct prime numbers 3 and 71, it is a semiprime, the first of a triple of three consecutive semiprimes 213, 214, and 215. Its square, 2132 = 45369, is one of only 15 known squares that can be represented as a sum of distinct factorials.

See also
 213 (disambiguation)

References

Integers

ca:Nombre 210#Nombres del 211 al 219